Don Templeton (15 August 1901 – 24 January 1952) was an  Australian rules footballer who played with South Melbourne in the Victorian Football League (VFL).

Notes

External links 

1901 births
1952 deaths
Australian rules footballers from Victoria (Australia)
Sydney Swans players
Casterton Football Club players